The Slayton Mercantile Co. is a site on the National Register of Historic Places located at Main and First Streets in Lavina, Montana.  It was added to the Register on December 28, 2000.

It is a two part two-story brick building built in 1910. It was deemed to be "a good example of turn of the 20th century Western commercial architecture", with a horizontal division between first and second floors.

References

Commercial buildings on the National Register of Historic Places in Montana
National Register of Historic Places in Golden Valley County, Montana
Commercial buildings completed in 1910
1910 establishments in Montana